In 1994 and 1995 Marvel, in partnership with Fleer, released the "Marvel Annual Flair" sets of collectible trading cards. These consisted primarily of art taken from comics, re-colored with computer coloring techniques, and printed on thick, glossy, card stock.

Flair 1994
The base set consists of 149 cards + the checklist. There are 18 "PowerBlast" chase cards which have foil on one side and a larger portion of the same image, without foil, on the other side. An error occurs in the set wherein no #6 card exists, but 2 #8 cards: Iron Man (which is listed on the checklist as #6) and the real card #8 Vulture. The "PowerBlast" set is made of #1 Cable, #2 Cyclops, #3 Iron Man, #4 Magneto, #5 Phoenix, #6 Storm, #7 Venom, #8 Wolverine, #9 Ghost Rider, #10 Punisher, #11 Captain America, #12 Gambit, #13 Thor, #14 Silver Surfer, #15 Spider-Man, #16 Deadpool, #17 Invisible Woman and #18 Dr. Doom.

Flair 1995
The base set consists of 149 cards + the checklist. For chase cards, there are 24 PowerBlast chase cards of the same style as the 1994 ones. This set also included 3 "DuoBlast" cards which have a different character on each side (I.e. Iron Man and War Machine). Another first for a Marvel set are the "HoloBlasts" which show 2 characters fighting, but one character is printed normally, and the other is a hologram. There are also 12 chromium cards. An official binder was also produced for the set.

Flair 2019
Upper Deck's 2019 Flair Marvel features original artwork and premium cards for superheroes from the Marvel Universe. A variety of opportunities arise with this product. Consider the 2019 Flair Marvel Buybacks / Sketch Cards. They are among the rarest card choices with hand-drawn Sketch cards and the original Buyback cards from the 1994 Flair Marvel and 1995 Flair Marvel sets. Collect the entire 90-card Base Set featuring all original art, including artist autographed cards!

Look for New and Throwback Premium Insert Designs, such as the Power Blast Spectrum, Pieces of Flair Patch Cards, Singularity, Stained Glass Plexiglas Cards, Totemic Teams, Lucky 8's, and Through the Ages!

External links
 Marvel Flair 1994 Checklist
 Marvel Flair 1995 Checklist
https://upperdeckstore.com/2019-marvel-flair.html

Trading cards
Works based on Marvel Comics